XHLAR may refer to:

XHLAR-TDT, a television station in Nuevo Laredo, Tamaulipas
XHLAR-FM, a radio station in Bacalar, Quintana Roo